Monaco competed at the 2014 Winter Olympics in Sochi, Russia, from 7 to 23 February 2014. Monaco's team consisted of five athletes plus one alternate for bobsleigh, competing in two sports.

Alpine skiing 

According to the final quota allocation released on 20 January 2014, Monaco had three athletes in qualification position.

Bobsleigh 

Qualification standings indicated Monaco had qualified a 2-man sled. Monaco's team consisted of two athletes, plus an alternate (Rudy Rinaldi).

* – Denotes the driver of each sled

References

External links 
Monaco at the 2014 Winter Olympics

Nations at the 2014 Winter Olympics
2014
2014 in Monégasque sport